Kireet Joshi was an Indian philosopher, and disciple of Sri Aurobindo and Mirra Alfassa. In 1976, the Prime Minister of India, Indira Gandhi, appointed Kireet as Education Advisor to the Government of India. He also served as the Chairman of the Indian Council of Philosophical Research.

Biography 
Joshi was born on 10 August 1931. He studied philosophy and law at the Bombay University. He was selected for I.A.S. in 1955 but in 1956 he resigned from the post of Assistant Collector of Surat in order to devote himself at Pondicherry (now Puducherry) to the study and practice of the Integral Yoga of Sri Aurobindo and the Mother. He taught Philosophy and Psychology at the Sri Aurobindo International Centre of Education at Pondicherry and participated in numerous educational experiments under the direct guidance of the Mother. 
In 1976, Government of India invited him to be Educational Advisor in the Ministry of Education. In 1983, he was appointed Special Secretary to the Government of India, and held this post until 1988. He was Member-Secretary of Indian Council of Philosophical Research from 1981 to 1990. He was also Member-Secretary of Rashtriya Veda Vidya Pratishthan from 1987 to 1993. He was the Vice-Chairman of the UNESCO Institute of Education, Hamburg, from 1987 to 1989. 
From 1999 to 2004, he was the Chairman of Auroville Foundation. As an adviser of Gujarat Chief Minister, he also helped in establishing Children's University and Institute of Teachers Education in state of Gujarat. From 2000 to 2006, he was Chairman of Indian Council of Philosophical Research. From 2006 to 2008, he was Editorial Fellow of the Project of History of Indian Science, Philosophy and Culture (PHISPC). He died on 14 September 2014 in Puducherry.

Bibliography

Synthesis of yoga and allied themes 
 Sri Aurobindo and The Mother

Books on philosophy 
 A Philosophy of The Role of The Contemporary Teacher
 A Philosophy of Education for The Contemporary Youth
 A Philosophy of Evolution for The Contemporary Man
 Philosophy and Yoga of Sri Aurobindo and Other Essays
 Philosophy of Value-Oriented Education (Theory and Practice)
 Philosophy of Supermind and Contemporary Crisis
 On Materialism
 Towards Universal Fraternity
 Towards A New Social Order

Indian culture
 The Veda and Indian Culture

Education 
 Education at Crossroads

Teaching learning material for teacher training 
 The Aim of Life
 The Good Teacher and the Good Pupil
 Mystery and Excellence of the Human Body

Monographs related to the theme of illumination, heroism, and harmony 
• Parvati's Tapasya
• Nachiketas

Speeches, lectures and videos
 A New Synthesis of Yoga as a necessity to overcome the impasse of modernity - Skype

References

External links
 Official Website	
 Online Lectures - by Kireet Joshi

1931 births
2014 deaths
20th-century Indian philosophers